Tyukhtetsky District is an administrative and municipal district (raion), one of the forty-three in Krasnoyarsk Krai, Russia. It is located in the southwest of the krai and borders with Yeniseysky District in the north, Birilyussky and Bolsheuluysky Districts in the east, Bogotolsky District in the south, and with Kemerovo and Tomsk Oblasts in the west. Its administrative center is the rural locality (a selo) of Tyukhtet. Population:  10,386 (2002 Census);  The population of Tyukhtet accounts for 54.1% of the district's total population.

History
The district was founded on May 25, 1925.

Government
As of 2013, the Head of the district is Gennady P. Dzalba and the Chairman of the District Council is Viktor S. Petrovich.

References

Notes

Sources

Districts of Krasnoyarsk Krai
States and territories established in 1925